Warton is a surname. Notable people with the name include:

Brett Warton (born 1975) Australian former professional rugby league footballer
Charles Warton (1832–1900) British and Australian politician
Dan Warton (born 1972) English drummer 
Joseph Warton (1722–1800) English literary critic
Michael Warton (died 1645) (1593–1645), English politician
Robert Warton (umpire) (1847–1923), English cricket umpire
Robert Parfew, also known as Robert Warton, (died 1557), English Benedictine abbot
Thomas Warton (1728–1790) English literary historian and Poet Laureate
Thomas Warton the elder (c. 1688 – 1745), English clergyman and schoolmaster